The Men's U23 South American Volleyball Championship is a sport competition for national volleyball teams with players under 23 years, currently held biannually and organized by the Confederación Sudamericana de Voleibol (CSV), the South American volleyball federation.

Results summary

Medals summary

MVP by edition
2014 – 
2016 –

See also

 Women's U22 South American Volleyball Championship
 Men's Junior South American Volleyball Championship
 Boys' Youth South American Volleyball Championship
 Boys' U17 South American Volleyball Championship

References
CSV

U23
U23
Recurring sporting events established in 2014
International volleyball competitions
International men's volleyball competitions
Youth volleyball
Biennial sporting events